Trans is the twelfth studio album by Canadian musician and singer-songwriter Neil Young, released on January 10, 1983. Recorded and released during his Geffen era in the 1980s, its electronic sound baffled many fans upon its initial release—a Sennheiser vocoder VSM201 features prominently in six of the nine tracks.

Background
In 1982, Young left Reprise Records, his record label since his debut album in 1968, to sign with Geffen Records—the label founded and owned by David Geffen, who had worked with Young as manager of Crosby, Stills, Nash & Young. Young's contract guaranteed him $1 million per album, as well as total creative control over his output.

From late 1980 to mid-1982, Young spent much of his waking hours carrying out a therapy program for his young son, Ben, who was born with cerebral palsy and unable to speak. Neil disclosed to almost no one at the time that he was doing so, or that the repetitive nature of the songs on both the previous album, Re·ac·tor, and this one related to the exercises he was performing with Ben. Work on Trans began in late 1981 as a continuation of Re·ac·tor, with the usual Crazy Horse lineup. But then Young started playing with two new machines he had acquired, a Synclavier and a vocoder. Crazy Horse guitarist Poncho Sampedro recalled, "Next thing we knew, Neil stripped all our music off, overdubbed all this stuff, the vocoder, weird sequencing, and put the synth shit on it."

Young's direction was influenced by the electronic experiments of the German band Kraftwerk, but more importantly he felt that distorting his voice reflected his attempts to communicate with his son. "At that time he was simply trying to find a way to talk, to communicate with other people. That's what Trans is all about. And that's why, on that record, you know I'm saying something but you can't understand what it is. Well, that's exactly the same feeling I was getting from my son."

Young's first work for Geffen was a group of songs for an entirely different project, Island in the Sun, recorded in May 1982 in Hawaii. According to Young, it was "a tropical thing all about sailing, ancient civilisations, islands and water." Young recalled later, "Geffen thought it was okay, but he didn't think it was good enough."

Instead of recording more new material, Young went back to the synthesizer tracks, actually recorded in the last days of the Reprise contract, and put together an album of songs from the two very different projects, three from Island in the Sun and six of the synthesizer tracks. Young proposed making a video to go with the album that would have clarified what the album was about. "All of the electronic-voice people were working in a hospital, and the one thing they were trying to do is teach this little baby to push a button."

Release and legacy 
After a year of work, Trans was mixed in a hurry because Young was eager to go out on tour (documented in the home video Neil Young in Berlin), and a last-minute change in the running order is evident in the inclusion of a song called "If You Got Love" in the track listing and lyric sheet, even though it is not on the album. The last-minute mixing was commented on by Young in 1995: "I don't underrate Trans. I really like it, and think if anything is wrong, then it's down to the mixing. We had a lot of technical problems on that record, but the content of the record is great."

The album was slated for a December 1982 release, but Geffen pushed the release into early January, firstly to January 3 and then, according to Young, a final date of January 10. According to Jim Sullivan of The Boston Globe, the electronic rock album was considered Young's "most radical move". In an interview with Musician, Young said: "I feel electronic music has replaced the acoustic music that I used to do with my guitar. I can go a lot farther than I've gone… this is just the beginning… I love machines." Portions of several tracks appeared in Young's 1982 feature-length comedy film Human Highway. Trans, along with Young's next Geffen release Everybody's Rockin', formed the basis of a 1983 lawsuit filed against Young by Geffen on the grounds that he had produced deliberately uncommercial and unrepresentative work. Young responded with a countersuit. Both suits were dropped within a matter of months, and David Geffen wound up personally apologizing to Young.

Critical reception

Trans received mixed reviews from music critics. Barney Hoskyns of NME described Trans as "Young's love song to the future" and noted the electronic style, but felt that he "isn't bothered or bitter enough for this transformation to grow into a vision, a new music". He described the album as "neither very soulful nor very mechanistic" and further panned the use of the vocoder for occasionally making the album recall "the kind of horrid electronic carols you get on your Christmas TV." He wrote: "Where Kraftwerk are concerned less with transformation than with control of information, Young's rather sudden initiation into the new technology merely makes him want to speed up time.". Jon Young of Trouser Press felt that, with Trans, Young had accelerated his "Devo" angle" from the earlier album Rust Never Sleeps (1979) into "his own impression of an increasingly mechanized world". However, he felt that Young had settled on the "robotic" style of the album before settling on subject matter, resulting in a "halfbaked yet arresting" minor work. A reviewer for Record Business noted how Young had "gone electronic" with extensive vocoder usage, and added: "How much this will affect the traditional Young sales is unknown but it prompted CBS to delay its release by two months."

However, Rolling Stone reviewer Parke Puterbaugh was favourable to Trans, considering it to be "as drastic a break from career form" as David Bowie's Low (1977) and "twice as surprising, too, because Young, despite his penchant for shifting gears from record to record, has always sunk his roots deep into the good earth, the fertile loam, of the American singer songwriter tradition." He noted the influence of Kraftwerk's Computer World (1981) throughout the album as well as the inclusion of the more traditional Crazy Horse material, resulting in an "intriguing puzzle". He also noted that, as with Rust Never Sleeps, Live Rust (1979) and Re·ac·tor (1981), Trans sees Young "stumping on behalf of the musical New Wave and the technological Next Wave." Robert Christgau of The Village Voice admitted to being confused by the album's "sci-fi ditties" at first, believing them "his dumbest gaffe since Journey Through the Past", but later realised the record was  charming and "as tuneful as Comes a Time".

Retrospectively, William Ruhlmann of AllMusic wrote that, on release, Trans was Young's "most baffling album", and remained for him "an idea that just didn't work". He noted how the vocoder erased the "dynamics and phrasing" of Young's voice, preventing the songs from "being as moving as they were intended to be", and felt that the "crisp dance beats and synthesizers" did not sound contemporary, better resembling early Devo than Kraftwerk. However, Pitchfork reviewer Sam Sodomsky praised Trans for being "an album about affection", which he said boosts its appeal beyond its "mythology" as a "puzzling-if-fascinating failure" in the manner of Bob Dylan's Self Portrait (1970) and Lou Reed's Metal Machine Music (1975). He also noted that, while considered an "aggressive and inscrutable" album, Trans is, "at its heart", a hooky synthesised pop album "informed equally by krautrock and MTV".

Legacy
According to James Jackson Toth of Stereogum, writing in 2013, the reputation of Trans as a "catastrophic failed experiment" had begun being disputed by "revisionist hipsters, who cite it as a precursor to minimal wave, techno, and countless electronic music subgenres," although disagreed with this himself due to the inclusion of the more traditional rock songs. He did, however, add that much of the album is "incredibly prescient", stating: "the fantastic 'Computer Age' still has no sonic analogue anywhere in music; the proto-electro 'Sample and Hold' invents Daft Punk; a re-recording of 'Mr. Soul' sounds like Thomas Dolby off the meds; and the gorgeous 'Transformer Man' proves that Grandaddy was not the first to outfit artificial intelligence with a heart of gold."

Track listing
All tracks are written by Neil Young.

Personnel
Neil Young – vocals, vocoder, guitars, bass, Synclavier, electric piano
Nils Lofgren – guitars, piano, organ, electric piano, Synclavier, backing vocals, vocoder
Ben Keith – pedal steel guitar, slide guitar, backing vocals
Frank Sampedro – guitars, synthesizer
Bruce Palmer, Billy Talbot – bass
Ralph Molina – drums, backing vocals
Joe Lala – percussion, backing vocals

References

External links
Lyrics at HyperRust.org
review in Rolling Stone

Neil Young albums
Albums produced by David Briggs (producer)
Geffen Records albums
Albums produced by Neil Young
Electronic albums by Canadian artists
Pop albums by Canadian artists
1983 albums
New wave albums by Canadian artists
Electronic rock albums by Canadian artists